Radostina Vasekova (born 10 February 1950) is a Bulgarian athlete. She competed in the women's shot put and the women's discus throw at the 1972 Summer Olympics.

References

1950 births
Living people
Athletes (track and field) at the 1972 Summer Olympics
Bulgarian female shot putters
Bulgarian female discus throwers
Olympic athletes of Bulgaria
Place of birth missing (living people)
Universiade medalists in athletics (track and field)
Universiade bronze medalists for Bulgaria